Sergey Valentinovich Sosnovsky (1 January 1955 – 3 July 2022) was a Soviet and Russian actor. Awarded a People's Artist of Russia (2004), he appeared in 100 films.

Biography
Sergey was born on 1 January 1955. He studied at the Slonov's Saratov Theater School and worked at the Saratov Academic Theater for Young Spectators and the Saratov Academic Drama Theater, after which he was accepted into the troupe of the Moscow Art Theater. He died on 3 July 2022, at the age of 67.

Selected filmography

References

External links 
 Sergey Sosnovsky on kino-teatr.ru
 

1955 births
2022 deaths
People from Krasnoyarsk Krai
Soviet male actors
Soviet male stage actors
Russian male film actors
Russian male television actors
Russian male stage actors
Honored Artists of the Russian Federation
People's Artists of Russia